The following lists of Incidents that occurred at various Warner Bros. theme parks are organized by resort area:
 List of incidents at Warner Bros. Jungle Habitat
 List of incidents at Warner Bros. Movie World

See also
Amusement park accidents

Warner Bros.
Warner Bros. Discovery-related lists
Warner Bros. Global Brands and Experiences